Cymatium is a genus of small to large predatory sea snails, marine gastropod mollusks in the family Cymatiidae.

This genus has numerous species, perhaps as many as 100, some of which have a worldwide distribution. The genus has been divided into at least 10 subgenera. Some authors have elevated those subgenera, giving them the full status of genera, but this is by no means universally accepted.

Fossil records
This genus is known in the fossil records from the Eocene to the Quaternary (age range: from 55.8 to 0.012 million years ago).

Description
These sea snails have separate sexes. They lay egg capsules. After hatching, the larvae have a planktonic stage that can (in some species) last several months; this is what enables the very widespread distribution seen in certain species, as the planktonic larvae can be carried great distances before settling to the sea floor.

Subgenera
There are at least 10 subgenera within the genus Cymatium . These are elevated by some authors to the level of genera.
 Cymatium Röding, 1798, type species: Cymatium femorale
 Monoplex G. Perry, 1811, type species: Cymatium parthenopeum
 Gelagna Schaufuss, 1869, type species: Cymatium succinctum
 Ranularia Schumacher, 1817, type species: Cymatium gutturnium
 Gutturnium Mørch, 1852, type species: Cymatium muricinum
 Reticutriton Habe and Kosuge, 1966, type species: Cymatium pfeifferianum
 Linatella Gray, 1868, type species: Cymatium cutaceum
 Lotoria Emerson and Old, 1963, type species: Cymatium perryi
 Septa Perry, 1810, type species: Septa rubecula: considered as a genus in WoRMS
 Turritriton Dall, 1904, type species: Cymatium gibbosum

Species
According to the World Register of Marine Species (WoRMS) the following species with accepted names are included within the genus Cymatium:
 Cymatium femorale (Linnaeus, 1758)
 Cymatium raderi D’Attilio & Myers, 1984
 Cymatium ranzanii (Bianconi, 1850)
 Cymatium tigrinum (Broderip, 1833)

Gallery

Species brought into synonymy 
 Cymatium aegrotum (Reeve, 1844): synonym of Ranularia gallinago (Reeve, 1844) 
 Cymatium aquatile (Reeve, 1844) : synonym of Monoplex aquatilis (Reeve, 1844) 
 Cymatium cingulatum (Lamarck, 1822): synonym of Linatella caudata (Gmelin, 1791) 
 Cymatium clandestinum (Lamarck, 1816): synonym of Gelagna succincta (Linnaeus, 1771)
 Cymatium closeli Beu, 1987: synonym of Septa closeli (Beu, 1987) 
 Cymatium comptum (A. Adams, 1855) : synonym of Monoplex comptus (A. Adams, 1855)
 Cymatium corrugatum (Lamarck, 1816);: synonym of Monoplex corrugatus (Lamarck, 1816) 
 Cymatium cutaceum (Lamarck, 1816): synonym of Linatella caudata (Gmelin, 1791) 
 Cymatium cynocephalum (Lamarck, 1816) : synonym of Ranularia cynocephala (Lamarck, 1816)
 Cymatium doliarium Lamarck: synonym of Cabestana dolaria (Linnaeus, 1767) 
 Cymatium durbanensis (E.A. Smith, 1899): synonym of  Monoplex durbanensis (E.A. Smith, 1899)
 Cymatium exaratum (Reeve, 1844): synonym of Monoplex exaratus (Reeve, 1844)
 Cymatium exaratum durbanense (E. A. Smith, 1899): synonym of Cymatium exaratum (Reeve, 1844) accepted as Monoplex exaratus (Reeve, 1844)
 Cymatium exile: synonym of Ranularia exilis (Reeve, 1844) 
 Cymatium gallinago (Reeve, 1844): synonym of Ranularia gallinago (Reeve, 1844) 
 Cymatium gemmatum Reeve: synonym of Monoplex gemmatus (Reeve, 1844)
 Cymatium gibbosum (Broderip, 1833): synonym of Turritriton gibbosus (Broderip, 1833)
 Cymatium grandimaculatum (Reeve, 1844): synonym of Lotoria grandimaculata (Reeve, 1844) 
 Cymatium hepaticum (Röding, 1798): synonym of Septa hepatica (Röding, 1798) 
 Cymatium kleinei (Sowerby III, 1889): synonym of Monoplex klenei (G.B. Sowerby III, 1889) 
 Cymatium kobelti: synonym of Turritriton kobelti (Maltzan, 1884) 
 Cymatium krebsii (Mörch, 1877) : synonym of Monoplex krebsii (Mörch, 1877) 
 Cymatium labiosum  (W. Wood, 1828) : synonym of Turritriton labiosus (Wood, 1828) 
 Cymatium lotorium  (Linnaeus, 1758): synonym of Lotoria lotoria (Linnaeus, 1758)
 Cymatium marerubrum: synonym of Septa marerubrum (Garcia-Talavera, 1985)
 Cymatium martinianum (d'Orbigny, 1847) : synonym of Monoplex martinianus (d'Orbigny, 1847) 
 Cymatium moniliferum (Adams & Reeve, 1850): synonym of Ranularia monilifera (A. Adams & Reeve, 1850) 
 Cymatium moritinctum (Reeve, 1844): synonym of Ranularia cynocephala (Lamarck, 1816) 
 Cymatium mundum (Gould, 1849): synonym of Monoplex mundus (Gould, 1849) 
 Cymatium muricinum  (Röding, 1798) : synonym of Gutturnium muricinum (Röding, 1798) 
 Cymatium nicobaricum (Röding, 1798) : synonym of Monoplex nicobaricus (Röding, 1798) 
 Cymatium occidentale (Mörch, 1877) is a synonym of Septa occidentalis (Mörch, 1877)
 Cymatium olearium Linnaeus: synonym of Ranella olearium (Linnaeus, 1758) 
 Cymatium (Septa) parthenopeum (von Salis, 1793) : synonym of Monoplex parthenopeus (Salis Marschlins, 1793)
 Cymatium (Monoplex) parthenopeum (Salis, 1793): synonym of Monoplex parthenopeus (Salis Marschlins, 1793)
 Cymatium penniketi Beu, 1998: synonym of Monoplex penniketi (Beu, 1998) 
 Cymatium pharcidum (Dall, 1889): synonym of Turritriton tenuiliratus (Lischke, 1873) 
 Cymatium pfeifferianum (Reeve, 1844): synonym of Reticutriton pfeifferianus (Reeve, 1844)
 Cymatium pileare (Linnaeus, 1758): synonym of Monoplex pilearis (Linnaeus, 1758) 
 Cymatium pyrum (Linnaeus, 1758): synonym of Ranularia pyrum (Linnaeus, 1758) 
 Cymatium rubeculum (Linnaeus, 1758): synonym of Septa rubecula (Linnaeus, 1758) 
 Cymatium sarcostomum (Reeve, 1844): synonym of Ranularia sarcostoma (Reeve, 1844) 
 Cymatium (Ranularia) sinense (Reeve, 1844):  synonym of Ranularia sinensis (Reeve, 1844)
 Cymatium (Linatella) succinctum (Linnaeus, 1771): synonym of Linatella succincta (Linnaeus, 1771)
 Cymatium testudinarium (A. Adams & Reeve, 1850): synonym of Ranularia testudinaria (A. Adams & Reeve, 1850) 
 Cymatium tranquebaricum (Lamarck, 1816): synonym of Monoplex tranquebaricus (Lamarck, 1816)
 Cymatium trigonum (Gmelin, 1791): synonym of  Monoplex trigonus (Gmelin, 1791)
 Cymatium trilineatum: synonym of Ranularia trilineata (Reeve, 1844) 
 Cymatium vespaceum Lamarck, 1822: synonym of Monoplex vespaceus (Lamarck, 1822)

Cymatium species found in the Western Atlantic include:
 Cymatium rehderi A. H. Verrill, 1950  :  synonym of  Ranularia rehderi (A.H. Verrill, 1950)

Other species include:
 Cymatium tabulatus aka Turritriton tabulatus exaratus (Reeve, 1844)
 Cymatium parkinsonianum (Perry, 1811): synonym of Austrotriton parkinsonius Perry, 1811
 Cymatium pileare (Linnaeus, 1758): synonym of Cymatium (Septa) pileare (Linnaeus, 1758)
 Cymatium perryi Emerson, W.K. & W.E. Jr. Old, 1963: synonym of Lotoria perryi (Emerson & Old, 1963)

References

 Info about subgenera and illustrations of type species for the subgenera and other species in the subgenera at 
 Malacolog info at: 

Cymatiidae
Extant Eocene first appearances
Gastropod genera